Villa Carmen is a corregimiento in Capira District, Panamá Oeste Province, Panama with a population of 1,352 as of 2010. Its population as of 1990 was 956; its population as of 2000 was 1,287.

References

Corregimientos of Panamá Oeste Province